The England national rugby league team represents England in international rugby league.

The team, largely formed from the Great Britain team which also represented Wales and Scotland, is run under the auspices of the Rugby Football League. It participates in the Rugby League World Cup, Four Nations and Test matches.

The team dates to 1904, when they played against a mixture of Welsh and Scottish players in Wigan. Until the 1950s, they regularly toured Australia and New Zealand and played both home and away matches against neighbours Wales and France, but when it was decided that Great Britain would tour the Southern Hemisphere instead of England, France and Wales became the only regular opponents.

Their first appearance in the Rugby League World Cup was in 1975. They have been three times runners-up; in 1975, 1995 and 2017. England also competed in the European Nations Cup, and, in 2006, an England 'A' team competed for the Federation Shield.

England's main rivals historically were Wales and France, with the rivalries stretching back to 1908 and 1934 respectively. England's main rivals now are Australia and New Zealand.

Traditionally a predominantly white kit is worn including white shorts and socks. However the jersey usually features some form of red, like red stripes, crosses or chevrons. These colours are similar to other English sporting teams and are the colours used on the national flag. In 2008, a new kit was introduced featuring a red cross on the front and red strips down the sides of the jersey, shorts and socks were white too with red strips. Also in 2008, the Rugby Football League chose to abandon the traditional English lion on the badge in favour of a much simpler shield and cross design.

Currently, the team is ranked fourth in the world, behind Australia, New Zealand and Samoa. Shaun Wane is the head coach, and Sean O'Loughlin the captain.

In 2019, it was announced that England will compete against Australia in future Rugby League Ashes series. Formerly the Ashes were contested between Great Britain and Australia up until 2003. The first Ashes series since 2003 was due to take place in 2020 but was cancelled due to the ongoing COVID-19 pandemic.

History

The first matches

In 1895, twenty-one clubs split with the Rugby Football Union, citing that they wanted to play professionally, and formed the Northern Rugby Football Union. The twenty-one clubs were all from Northern England and the players were largely working class. However it was not just English players who made the switch, Scottish and Welsh players also switched allegiance to the new code, wanting payments for playing. Switching heightened in the early 20th century with more Scottish and Welsh players leaving the RFU than ever before.

The England national rugby union team had been playing international matches since 1871, but it was not until 1904, nine years after the formation of the new code, that an international rugby league match was played. At the start of 1903 season the Northern Union thought about international matches and scheduled a match for England on New Year's Day 1904 in Oldham. On that day though, the ground was frosty and the match was cancelled and it was rescheduled for April.

On 5 April 1904 England competed against a team called "Other Nationalities", who were made up of ten Welshman and two Scotsman, including George Frater, who captained the side. It was a period of experimentation for the Northern Union and each team had twelve players, not thirteen. At Central Park, Wigan the ground was muddy and in poor condition, however the match went ahead. England steamed into a 3–0 lead, from a try by Warrington's Jackie Fish. This is despite Salford's James Lomas arriving late and causing England to start the match with eleven players. Fish missed the conversion and so the Other Nationalities were able to level the scores a little later, Welshman Thomas crashing over for a try. The conversion was missed and going into half-time the score was tied 3–3. In the second half Thomas went over for another try before Wigan's Harris sealed a 9–3 win for the Other Nationalities in the final minutes of the match. A total of 6,000 spectators turned up for the match, which was considered a poor showing despite a Broughton Rangers v Bradford cup clash being scheduled on the same day.

In 1905 a match between the two sides was played at Bradford. This time England won 26–11 even though they were losing 11–0 at half-time. Wigan's Jim Leytham scored four tries in succession, a record that still stand today. The match was played with fifteen players on each side and so was the 1906 match. Played in Wigan again, the match finished a 3–3 draw. The concept was abandoned after the 1906 match. By 1908 the game had expanded much more into Australia, New Zealand and Wales and England began playing those teams. Harold Wagstaff made his debut for England in 1908 against the touring Kangaroos team at 17 years and 228 days.

The Other Nationalities side did return in 1921.
An England side beat the Australasian team of the 1921–22 Kangaroo tour of Great Britain 4–5 at Highbury.  
England played only one international between 10 May 1956 and 7 November 1968 an 18–6 victory at Headingley Rugby Stadium, Leeds.

1975 World Cup debut

England played at the World Cup in 1975 coached by Alex Murphy, which was played over several months in both hemispheres on a league basis. Normally Great Britain would represent England in the World Cup, but the RLIF wanted to capitalise on the large number of Welsh players in the game at the time, and so England and Wales fielded separate teams.

England won their first match, a 20–2 victory over France in Leeds in March. In June the Lions suffered their first defeat in just their second match of the tournament, losing 12–7 against a strong Wales side in Brisbane. A little later England managed to hold on for a draw against Australia in Sydney, the final score being 10–10. And they also picked up a point in Auckland, drawing 17–17 against New Zealand. At the end of October, after the domestic season had finished, England beat the Welsh 22–16 in Warrington and then crossed the English Channel to thrash a French side 48–2 in Bordeaux. Bradford played host the England versus New Zealand match, in which England won comfortably 27–12.

At the start of November, England squeezed past Australia winning 16–13 in November at Wigan. This meant that the Kangaroos had finished on 13 points, with the Lions on 12 points. Australia were deemed champions by finishing top of the table, but because they had not beaten England a final match was quickly arranged. Australia beat England 25–0 at Leeds to clinch their fourth title.

1995 World Cup and hiatus
With the break up of the Great Britain team into its individual nations, England (as co-host) were in the 1995 World Cup, their first appearance in the World Cup since 1975. England were coached by Phil Larder. The Lions got off to a flying start beating Australia 20–16 in the opening game at Wembley, then hammering Fiji and South Africa in the remaining group games to finish top of group A. This set up a semi-final game at Old Trafford against Wales. England won the tussle 25–10 to reach the World Cup final, but they lost 16–8 to Australia at Wembley Stadium. England would not play again until 2000.

The 1995 World Cup saw the first change of the England strip in a number of years. Instead of the usual all-white kit, an offset red St George's Cross was added to both the front and back of the jumper.

2000 World Cup
John Kear was coach of England for the World Cup in 2000. Compared to 1995, England had little success, losing their opening game at Twickenham 22–2 against Australia. But they won their remaining two pool games against Fiji and Russia. A surprisingly competitive display by Ireland in the quarter-finals, saw England scrape through to the semi-finals 26–16. England then went down to a record defeat, losing 49–6 to New Zealand at Bolton, and were knocked out of the tournament.

2008–2009: Tony Smith era

Australian born, Tony Smith, took charge of England in 2008. His first game was against France in Toulouse where the English won 56–8. In his second game, England were missing St Helens and Leeds Rhinos players but the team still created history with a record 74–0 win over Wales in Doncaster. It was England's biggest win recorded over the Welsh since 1978.

2008 World Cup
It was World Cup year, and Smith announced his ambitions that he wanted England to win their first World Cup, since 1972, when Great Britain represented the country at the event. In the event they were placed in Group A alongside hosts Australia, New Zealand and Papua New Guinea. England faced a scare in their opening game against Papua New Guinea, as Smith's men were trailing 12–16 at halftime, but they did go on to win the game. England were humiliated in their second game against the hosts, suffering their biggest defeat to date, beating their 43-point margin against New Zealand eight years ago. In their final pool game against New Zealand, they produced a much better performance but for only 28 minutes, as they gave up a 24–8 lead to lose 24–36. Before, and during the match, England were accusing New Zealand of being soft, however, after the match, media outlets were calling England the biggest losers of the tournament. Controversy also occurred before the game kicked off, when England refused to face New Zealand's haka challenge. Smith said 'In some cultures poking your tongue out at others could be seen as insulting and the Kiwis pushed things too far by crossing into England's side of halfway.' They took on New Zealand again in the semi-final. This time they never had the lead over the Kiwis, as they lost the match by 10 points. After rumours Smith would be sacked from his position, the RFL announced they'd keep faith in Smith for the remainder of his contract. The World Cup players took the blame for their performances.

After the World Cup nightmare, England began 2009 on a high-note with a record-breaking 54-point away win over France.

2009 Four Nations
Later that year, England were co-hosts of the year's major international tournament, the inaugural Four Nations. After thrashing them earlier in the year, England faced a shock half-time deficit in their opening game against a French side coached by former Great Britain international Bobbie Goulding. But despite trailing at the interval, England scored 30 consecutive points to record another victory over 'Les Tricolores'. In the second match against Australia, England impressively kept Australia scoreless in the second half, and staged a second-half comeback. However it wasn't enough, as Smith's men needed to recover from a 26-point half-time deficit. They then took on New Zealand and, after losing to them twice at last year's World Cup, England earned revenge with an 8-point win over the Kiwis. England then went on to make the final to face Australia. In the final England, at one point, led 16–14 and were credited with how they were able to produce a real contest. However, in the final quarter of the game, Australia dominated proceedings and eventually went on to win 46–16. On 16 November 2009, a few hours after crediting that the England national team had a bright future in rugby league, Smith resigned from the English national side.

2010–2015: Steve McNamara era
Following Tony Smiths resignation, former Bradford Bulls head coach Steve McNamara was given the job. His first game in charge of England was against France in Leigh. England thrashed the French to keep their impressive winning run going over their opponents that dates back to 1981. McNamara also fielded the first brothers, Sam and Joel Tomkins, to start on the field for England since Paul and David Hulme represented Great Britain in 1989.

2011 Four Nations
The following year, England co-hosted the 2011 Four Nations with Wales. Their opening game was a win against Wales where Sam Tomkins scored a record-equalling four tries in one game. The win meant England kept their impressive record of not losing on home soil against Wales since 1977. A loss the following week to Australia at Wembley meant that they had to beat New Zealand to make the final, which they did. In the final, England at one point were tied at 8–8, but they would be outclassed again. England were held 'try-less' in the second half as Australia won by 22 points.

In mid-2012, the second International Origin series was held. The Exiles had won the first series in 2011 after Samoan International, George Carmont, scored a try with less than 40 seconds remaining to win the game for the Exiles. England won their first ever International Origin series game, after winning game 1 of the 2012 series, held in St Helens, by 8 points. However the Exiles would win the 2012 series after recording a bigger winning margin in game 2. In October and November that year, England competed in the Autumn Internationals where they took on Wales, and France. In their first game, England racked up their biggest points tally against Wales, as they thrashed 'the Red Dragons' 80–12 in Wrexham. In their second game against France, fullback Sam Tomkins became England's top try scorer when he scored his 14th try for England, breaking the record set by former Wigan and St Helens winger Alf Ellaby in 1935. In the final, England had a rematch with France at Salford City Stadium. England thrashed their opponents to win their first tournament title since the 2004 European Nations Cup.

2013 World Cup
In the lone 2013 International Origin game, England thrashed their opponents by 20 points. At the end of the year, the 2013 World Cup was held in England and Wales. England, who were now known as the 'Wall of White', featured a new record of three brothers in their squad: Sam and twins George and Tom Burgess. England played their first game against Australia in Cardiff. England got off to a surprising early lead for many, when they were up 10–0 after 20 minutes. England, however, went on to lose in what was one of their best displays against the Kangaroos in years, losing 20–28. They then went on to thrash Ireland to nil in front of a record crowd in Huddersfield, in a game which saw Ryan Hall become the new England top try-scorer after a hat-trick took him to tally 17 total tries for his country. England also beat a determined Fiji, in front a sold-out crowd at the KC Stadium, to advance to the quarter-finals. They took on European rivals, France, in Wigan and, after trailing 0–6 early, England went on to advance to the semi-finals to meet defending World Champions, New Zealand, at Wembley. The game was a see-saw affair, which saw England leading 18–14 with one minute on the clock remaining, until New Zealand play-maker Shaun Johnson produced a historical moment, to level the scores, and then convert his try after the siren, to win the match, and make the Kiwis advance to a third consecutive World Cup Final. This was the first time England, or Great Britain, had lost to New Zealand in England since 2005.

2014 Four Nations
In October and November 2014, England travelled down-under to play in the 2014 Four Nations. In the opening game, England took on Samoa in an affair which saw the lead change several times. In the end, England survived a shock result occurring after winning by 6 points. In the second game against Australia, controversy occurred. Australia led 16–12 with one minute left on the clock. England player, Liam Farrell, put a grubber-kick in the in-goal area, which forced Australian fullback, Greg Inglis, to force the ball dead, however, the video referees decided to have a look and see whether or not Inglis or the incoming Ryan Hall got the last touch on the ball. On the slow-motion replays, it showed that Ryan Hall's right hand's little finger had put some downward pressure on the ball, however, in normal speed, it was deemed 'inconclusive' by Australian officiating rules. It was eventually given a no-try to the anger of English players and fans. Ryan complained on Twitter, saying "Looking at the video, I’d say it was a try if we’re playing Super League rules..." Had Hall scored, and England converted, it would have been England's first win over Australia since 1995, the first time Australia suffered back-to-back home defeats since 1970 and the first time Australia did not qualify for a tournament final since the 1954 World Cup final. England lost their final game against New Zealand and, in the process, ended any chance of qualifying for their first Four Nations final in the Southern Hemisphere.

2015 Baskerville Shield
In 2015, England took on New Zealand in a three match series held in England. Before the series, England recorded their biggest ever win over France, beating their previous 73–6 win in 1996. England beat New Zealand 2–1 in the Baskerville Series to retain the trophy that Great Britain last won in 2007. During that series vice-captain, James Graham, reached the milestone of becoming England's most capped player, surpassing Kevin Sinfield's record of 27 test appearances. Despite the series victory, McNamara was facing scrutiny beforehand and the RFL decided not to renew his contract which expired after the series. McNamara therefore left the England national team.

2016–2019: Wayne Bennett era
Following McNamara's contract expiration, the RFL appointed Australian Wayne Bennett on a 2-year contract, with a view to win the 2017 World Cup. Bennett's first request as coach was for England to have a pre-season training camp, a mid-season international in 2017, as well as shortening the 2017 Super League season in order to prepare for the 2017 World Cup. RFL Chief Executive Nigel Wood accepted Bennett's first two demands, but said shortening the domestic season is a "big disturbance in lots of ways..." Bennett's plans suffered criticism from some professional club coaches.

2016 Four Nations
Bennett's first match was against France in Perpignan, in preparation for the 2016 Four Nations. Despite trailing, and being held scoreless in the first 26 minutes, England did go on to avoid an upset, convincingly beating the French and giving Bennett a successful return to the International scene, 8 years after he left the New Zealand assistant coach role. However England went onto having a disappointing Four Nations, losing the opening game to New Zealand, facing a scare against Scotland, before going on to lose a 'must-win' game against Australia. This marked the first time that England failed to qualify for a Four Nations final while being hosts.

At the end of 2016, Bennett announced that the England pre-season 'heat training camp' in Dubai would be cancelled after taking in the consideration of domestic coaches' concerns. Instead of a pre-season training camp, Bennett and the English coaching staff chose an Elite Performance Squad of players, based in England, who would be scouted regularly throughout the 2017 season. The squad trained six times throughout the season in England.

England's first game of 2017 was a convincing result over Samoa, although Bennett came under criticism of his selections for the test-match. Former Great Britain captain Garry Schofield, along with other former players, media, and fans were angered by Bennett's decision to include Australian born players Chris McQueen and Chris Heighington, who are eligible to play through their English fathers. Heighington's age was also a talking point. At the age of 35, it was suggested younger players such as Liam Farrell, Alex Walmsley, Mark Percival, and Scott Taylor, should have been selected instead.

2017 World Cup
Bennett only named one Australian, Chris Heighnington, in his England team for the World Cup, while Zak Hardaker missed out due to a drugs ban. England's first game of the World Cup was against Australia. Although they were credited throughout the match for the way they were able to defend and prevent the Australians from dominating the game like they have in the past they again failed to beat Australia. Despite the defeat, England continued their way through the tournament with convincing victories over Lebanon, France, finishing second in Group A. They then went on to beat Papua New Guinea convincingly in the quarter finals before reaching the semi-finals where they would take on Tonga who had knocked New Zealand out the week before. England led 20–0, with seven minutes left on the clock, before the Tongans began an unpredictable and nerve-wracking comeback for England. With less than one minute left on the clock, Andrew Fifita lost control of the ball before regathering it and putting it over the try-line, only to realise the referee had already blown his whistle. The referee was criticised for not going to the Video Referee and if awarded would have seen that Tonga won the game and reached their first ever World Cup final. Despite the controversy, England were victorious and had advanced to their first World Cup Final in 22 Years. England met Australia again in the final but again failed to beat Australia, for a 13th consecutive time, since their last win in the 1995 World Cup group stage. England lost in the lowest World Cup final score in the history of the tournament. Bennets contract expired at the end of the World Cup and despite not winning the tournament he was rewarded with another 2-year contract.

2020–present: Shaun Wane era
On 3 February 2020, it was announced that Shaun Wane would replace Bennett as Head Coach on a two-year contract with the intention of leading England in the 2020 Ashes series and the 2021 World Cup.
England started the 2021 Rugby League World Cup with a 60-6 victory over Samoa and finished top of their group after winning all three pool matches. England would then defeat Papua New Guinea to reach the semi-final. In the semi-final, England would lose 27-26 against Samoa during golden point extra-time.

2020 Rugby League Ashes Series
On 7 November 2019, it was confirmed that the Rugby League Ashes would return in 2020, after a 17-year hiatus. The competition, which was traditionally contested between Australia and Great Britain, was due to feature England for the first time but was cancelled due to the ongoing COVID-19 pandemic. The series was intended to be Wane's first games in charge of the national team.

Identity

Kits and colours
England traditionally play in white, their early colours were white with red and gold stripes while later they played in white and red hoops. They occasionally play in a red away kit but colour clashes are rare and they rarely wear an away kit.

In the 1975 World Cup they played in a fully white kit. While they predominately played in white and red blue was also occasionally incorporated into the kit. It wasn't until 1995 when the St George’s cross was first integrated into the kit. 

Ahead of the 2021 World Cup a radical New England kit was released which was white with navy blue shoulders and cross.

Kit evolution

Kit suppliers and sponsors

In a test match against France on 22 October 2016, Kingstone Press was replaced by Rugby to the Core due to the Evin law.

Badge
The Lions crest

From the 1995 Rugby League World cup, it was used a crest with the St. George's cross, the Three Lions Coat of Arms of England and Tudor rose. It was similar to most other English sporting badges, such as the England national football team and the English national cricket team which all promote similar attributes. Until the mid 1990s, England simply used a red lion rampant as crest.

The Shield Crest

The new official logo was launched on 6 February 2008 on the rugby league magazine programme Boots N' All. The cross of St George is positioned across a three-dimensional shield within the design. The date "1895" is placed through the centre of the cross, symbolising the birth of rugby league. Many people involved in the sport were consulted throughout the design process, which took a little under a year. The logo was first used for the 2008 World Cup and was replaced in 2017.

Three Lions Cross
As part of a rebrand across all of the RFL in 2017, a new England crest was introduced. It is a merge of both the shield crest and the old lions crest. It has the St. Georges cross on the background with three lions in front of it.

Media coverage
The BBC have the rights to screen all England games. They showed every game England competed in at the 2017 Rugby League World Cup, as well as all their Four Nations, and Baskerville Shield games. They also showed every game at the 2021 Rugby League World Cup in addition to women's and wheelchair games.

Coaching staff

Current squad

Squad selected for the 2021 Rugby League World Cup (played in 2022 due to the COVID-19 pandemic).

Records
Bold- denotes player still active at club level

Most capped players

As of 5 November 2022

Top try scorers

Top points scorers

Team Records
Biggest win: 
110-0 v.  (at Orlando, Florida, October 2000)
Biggest loss: 
52-4 v.  (at Melbourne Rectangular Stadium, 2 November 2008)

Highest all-time attendance: 
67,545 v.  (at Wembley, 23 November 2013)

Individual
 Most tries in a match: 
5:
Tommy Makinson v.  (at DW Stadium, 5 November 2022)
 Most goals in a match: 
15:
Wayne Godwin v.  (at Moscow, 25 Oct 2004)
 Most points in a match: 
34:
Wayne Godwin v.  (at Moscow, 25 Oct 2004)

Competitive record

Overall record
Below is a list of England's head-to-head record as of 18 October 2022.

Includes results from games against Exiles and Combined Nations All Stars.

World Cup

England have competed seven times in the World Cup; in 1975, 1995, 2000, 2008, 2013, 2017 and 2021. They have never won the competition, though finished runners-up to Australia in 1975, 1995 and 2017. In every other year, Great Britain have represented England. Despite having only played in 7 world cups, England have hosted matches in 8 different tournaments, including 3 that took part internationally. England have played 39 games in the world cup; winning 24, drawing 2 and losing 13. Of these losses, only two have been against a team other than New Zealand or Australia; Wales in 1975 and Samoa in 2021. England lost out on reaching the final in 2013, when New Zealand beat them 20-18 in the semi-final, after Shaun Johnson scored a conversion in the last 30 seconds of the game to secure the win.  England reached the world cup final in 2017, but were beaten by Australia with a score of just 6–0.

As hosts of the 2021 Rugby League World Cup, and as a team who reached the quarter finals in the previous world cup, England automatically qualified. They again reached the semi-final, but lost 27-26, on a golden point after extra time, to Samoa.

Four Nations

England replaced Great Britain in competing in the Rugby League Four Nations which replaced the previous Tri Nations tournament. They have been runners up twice in 2009 and 2011, these two tournaments also having been hosted by England.

European Championship

England have competed in twenty-six European Nations Cups, the first in 1935. In the past the tournament has been axed and revived many times, and it was stopped for six years because of the Second World War. From 1935 to 1949 (minus the war years) England played France and Wales annually, and won the tournament in 1935, 1946, 1947 and 1948. From 1950 to 1956 an Other Nationalities team were added as the fourth team in the competition (except in 1956 when Wales did not field a team). During those years England won in 1950 and 1954. Since then the tournament has run for some seasons, but never for more than five years at a time. But from 1970 to 1996 England won it six out of a possible nine times. In 2003 the tournament was revived and England comfortably won, beating her old rivals plus Scotland, Ireland and Russia. England beat the same opponents to win the cup again in 2004. This was the last time England competed to give the competition more of a level playing field for other teams, however the England Knights competed in 2012.

Minor tournaments

Honours
Major:
World Cup: 
Runners-up (3):  1975, 1995, 2017
Semi-finalists (4):  2000, 2008, 2013, 2021

Four Nations:
Runners-up (2): 
 2009, 2011

Regional:
European Championship: 
Winners (14):  1935, 1945–46, 1946–47, 1947–48, 1949–50, 1953–54, 1969–70, 1975, 1978, 1979, 1980, 1996, 2003, 2004

Minor:
Federation Shield:
Winners (1):  2006

Baskerville Shield:
Winners (2):  2015, 2018

World Ranking

Attendances

Highest Home Per Nation

Highest Home All-Time

England Knights

In 2011 the England Knights were created to serve as a step up for the younger players from their club in view of playing for the 1st team. A squad of players were chosen (below the age of 25) to represent the Knights in a few games. Their first ever game was against France and the Knights came out 38–18 victors.

The Knights won the 2012 European Cup by beating Ireland and Scotland in a 3-game tournament.

Famous players
The following players played for England and are either British Rugby League Hall of Fame inductees, or are one of the top five caps, tries, goals, or points scorers for England. Although both Gus Risman, and Jim Sullivan were Welsh, they are British Rugby League Hall of Fame inductees, and actually played for England, as well as for Wales and Great Britain. British Rugby League Hall of Fame inductee Vince Karalius was English (of Lithuanian heritage), and although he played for Great Britain, he never played for England, as England games were limited in his playing era.

 Eric Ashton
 Billy Batten
 Charlie Carr
 Douglas Clark
 William "Billy" Dingsdale
 Joe Egan
 Alf Ellaby
 George Fairbairn
 Andy Farrell
 Keith Fielding
 Neil Fox
 Ken Gee
 Ellery Hanley
 Martin Hodgson
 Jimmy Ledgard
 Roger Millward
 Alex Murphy
 Jonty Parkin
 Jamie Peacock
 Gus Risman
 Kevin Sinfield
 Jim Sullivan
 Harold Wagstaff
 Ernest Ward

See also

 Rugby league in England
 England women's national rugby league team
 England national wheelchair rugby league team
 Great Britain national rugby league team
 Rugby Football League
 British Rugby League Hall of Fame
 England national rugby league team match results
 List of England national rugby league team players

References

External links

 England Rugby League Team Official Website
 Rugby Football League Internationals
 2008 Rugby League World Cup Official Website
 Rugby League European Federation
 Official England Shop

 
National rugby league teams
Rugby league in England
Rugby League Four Nations
1904 establishments in England